Ptychocroca galenia is a species of moth of the family Tortricidae. It is found in Chile (from the Talca Province to the Malleco Province). It has been recorded from altitudes ranging from near sea level to about 1,600 meters.

Adults are on wing from November to January, probably in one generation per year.

References

Moths described in 1999
Euliini
Moths of South America
Taxa named by Józef Razowski
Endemic fauna of Chile